The Indecency with Children Act 1960  was an Act of the Parliament of the United Kingdom that expanded English criminal law in relation to sexual acts with minors. The Act made it a crime to incite or commit an "act of gross indecency" with somebody under the age of fourteen. It was repealed by the Sexual Offences Act 2003.

Act
The Act came about as the result of the First Report of the Criminal Law Revision Committee, which examined the flaw in criminal law relating to indecent assaults against children. Under the law as it then stood, there was no "indecent assault" unless there was some form of threat or show of force to the victim, and the Act was intended to close this gap. The Act came into force on 2 July 1960, and Section 1 made it an offence to commit or incite an "act of gross indecency" with somebody under the age of fourteen. The infractor was liable to  imprisonment for up to two years on conviction after indictment, and six months or a fine of £100 for a summary conviction. These figures were amended by Statutory Instruments in 2000, which increased the imprisonment for conviction after indictment to ten years, or two years for a summary conviction. The fine for a summary conviction was increased by the Criminal Justice Act 1967 to £400.

Section 2 of the Act increased the punishment for committing incest with a girl under the age of thirteen to seven years in prison for sexual intercourse or attempted sexual intercourse, and five years for indecent assault. This section was repealed by the Sexual Offences Act 1985. The Act as a whole was repealed by the Sexual Offences Act 2003.

References

Bibliography

United Kingdom Acts of Parliament 1960
Repealed United Kingdom Acts of Parliament